Carl Stuart Hamblen (October 20, 1908 – March 8, 1989) was an American entertainer who became one of radio's first singing cowboys in 1926, going on to become a singer, actor, radio show host, and songwriter. He underwent a Christian conversion and became a Temperance movement supporter and recurring candidate for political office. He is best known as the composer of the song "This Ole House" (1954), most notably recorded by Rosemary Clooney and Shakin' Stevens.

Early life

Hamblen was born into the family of an itinerant Methodist preacher on October 20, 1908 in Kellyville, Texas, United States. He married Suzy Daniels and they had two children. Hamblen's father was Dr. J. H. Hamblen, a minister in the Methodist Church in Texas, who in 1946 founded the Evangelical Methodist Church denomination in Abilene, Texas.

Career
From 1931, Hamblen began hosting the popular radio program Family Album in California. He also composed music and acted in motion pictures with cowboy stars including Gene Autry, Roy Rogers, and John Wayne. In 1934, he became the first artist signed by the American subsidiary of Decca Records.

Hamblen did not cope well with the pressures of his high-profile career and sought relief in alcohol. Many times his drinking landed him in jail for public brawling and other destructive behavior. The Texas State Historical Association reports that Hamblen identified himself as the "original juvenile delinquent." Because Hamblen was hugely popular, his radio sponsors regularly bailed him out of jail and smoothed things over. For a while, he ventured into horse-racing as an owner. Inevitably, Hamblen's drinking and gambling problems severely affected his life and career. In 1949 after years of struggle with alcohol, Hamblen underwent a religious conversion at a Billy Graham crusade in Los Angeles, and was soon fired from his radio program after refusing to do beer commercials. He subsequently gave up gambling and horse racing, and entered Christian broadcasting with his radio show The Cowboy Church of the Air, which ran until 1952.

Personal life
During a 1949 crusade in Los Angeles, Graham called Hamblen's conversion "the turning point" in the Billy Graham Evangelistic Association's ministry, where before Hamblen accepted Christ the crowds were rather small. Graham said Hamblen was the No. 1 radio personality in Los Angeles, which drew in crowds. That evening, also Graham's first coast-to-coast television broadcast, Hamblen shared about his faith and sang/spoke his signature hymn "It Is No Secret (What God Can Do)". Graham attributed Hamblen's hunting skills as instrumental in capturing a wild panther in the Los Angeles area prior to the crusade.

Stuart Hamblen died March 8, 1989, in Santa Monica, California of brain cancer.

Music 
In his early career as a singing cowboy he composed his song "Texas Plains". It was this song that Patsy Montana reworked into her million seller hit "I Want to Be a Cowboy's Sweetheart" (1935). Hamblen wrote the popular songs "This Ole House" (1954) (popularized by Rosemary Clooney, among others) and "Open Up Your Heart (And Let the Sunshine In)" (not to be confused with the song from the Broadway musical Hair). Other songs include "Hell Train", "It Is No Secret (What God Can Do)" and "Blood on Your Hands".

"It Is No Secret" was written following his acceptance of Christ and a spiritual conversation with John Wayne. After accepting the Lord, Hamblen was fired from his position as disc jockey because he refused to do alcohol commercials. John Wayne offered him a drink shortly thereafter, Hamblen refused saying "It is no secret what the Lord can do." John Wayne said, "You should write a song by that title." The song would go on to be sung by popular singers Rosemary Clooney, Kate Smith, Jim Reeves, Wayne Newton, Leslie Uggams, Jo Stafford & Gordon MacRae (duet), Anne Murray, Tom Netherton, Eddy Arnold, Pat Boone, Johnny Cash, Elvis Presley, Hank Snow and Ernest Tubb.

"This Ole House" was inspired while on a hunting trip in the High Sierras with John Wayne and guide Monte Wolfe. The two men came upon what looked like an abandoned shack, wherein they found the body of an elderly man, apparently dead of natural causes. Hamblen came up with the lyrics to the song while riding horseback down the mountain, and composed the melody within a week. In addition to being a number one hit for Clooney, it was later recorded by Roberta Sherwood and The Statler Brothers, among many others. In 1981, a version performed by Welsh rock'n'roll singer Shakin' Stevens topped the UK Singles Chart.

In 1955, Hamblen had a hit single with "Open Up Your Heart (And Let the Sunshine In)" b/w "The Lord is Counting on You", along with his family under the name The Cowboy Church Sunday School. Hamblen was accompanied by wife Suzy, daughters Veeva Suzanne and Obee Jane (Lisa), and two of the girls' friends. The song was recorded at the 33 RPM speed so that it sounds like children singing at the normal 7-inch single phonograph speed of 45 RPM. The tune hit No. 8 on the Billboard Hot 100 pop charts in 1955. "Open Up Your Heart (And Let the Sunshine In)" was sung on an episode of the television cartoon series The Flintstones in the mid-1960s by characters Pebbles and Bamm-Bamm.

Hamblen wrote the lyrics to the Christmas cult favorite, "Hardrock, Coco and Joe". An animated Christmas cartoon based on the song was created in the mid-1950s. Its running time is about 2 minutes and 45 seconds. The full title is Hardrock, Coco and Joe - The Three Little Dwarfs, but is commonly called Hardrock, Coco and Joe, after the song title.

One of Hamblen's few secular songs to become popular was "(Remember Me) I'm the One Who Loves You," recorded by Ernest Tubb, Jimmy Dean, Red Foley, and others, and made into a gold record by Dean Martin in a 1965 Reprise recording.

The Hamblen family participated in the Pasadena Rose Parade for many years riding Peruvian Paso horses.

At Mr. Hamblen's well-attended funeral in Los Angeles, a recording of Mr. Hamblen's was played; Billy Graham gave the eulogy. He is buried at Forest Lawn Memorial Park.

The Stuart Hamblen Collection, which includes Hamblen's original sound recordings, resides at the University of North Carolina at Chapel Hill within the Southern Folklife Collection.

Awards 
Hamblen was inducted into the Nashville Songwriters Hall of Fame in 1970, was presented the ACM Pioneer Award 1972, received the Gene Autry Golden Boot Award 1988, and was inducted into Texas Country Music Hall of Fame 2001. He later received a star on Hollywood's Walk of Fame. He was inducted into the Gospel Music Hall of Fame in 1994 and the Western Music Hall of Fame in 1999.

Jefferson, Texas (near Hamblen's birth home of Kelleyville, Texas) celebrates "Stuart Hamblen Days" each year, with a bronze plaque dedication taking place in the city park in 1998, sponsored by a local opera house.

Politics 

Hamblen supported the American temperance movement and ran as the Prohibition Party's candidate for U.S. president in the 1952 presidential election. Hamblen garnered 72,949 recorded popular votes and no electoral votes in an election in which Republican Dwight D. Eisenhower was elected President for the first of two terms, defeating Democrat Adlai Stevenson.

Previously, Hamblen ran for California's 20th congressional district seat as a Democrat, losing to Carl Hinshaw in the 1938 election cycle. The race ended with Hinshaw at 47 percent and Hamblen with 41 percent of the vote.

Discography

Albums 
 It's No Secret (RCA Victor, 1956)
 The Grand Old Hymns (RCA Victor, 1957)
 Hymns (Harmony, 1957)
 A Visit With Stuart Hamblen (Sacred, 1958)
 Immortal Treasures (Sacred, 1958)
 Remember Me (Coral, 1958)
 Beyond the Sun (RCA Camden, 1959)
 The Spell of the Yukon (Columbia, 1961)
 Of God I Sing (Columbia, 1962)
 This Old House Has Got to Go (Kapp, 1966)
 I Believe (Harmony, 1967)
 The Cowboy Church (Word, 1973)
 A Man and His Music (Lamb & Lion, 1974)
 The Worlds of Stuart Hamblen Volume 1: The Shooting of Dan McGrew (Voss, 1978)
 The Worlds of Stuart Hamblen Volume 2: The Legacy of Stuart Hamblen (Voss, 1978)
 The Worlds of Stuart Hamblen Volume 3: So Dear to My Heart (Voss, 1978)
 The Worlds of Stuart Hamblen Volume 4: Songs the Cowboy Sings (Voss, 1978)

Singles

Filmography

See also 
Prohibition Party presidential election results

References

External links 
 Black Cat Rockabilly - Stuart Hamblen
 
 Stuart Hamblen Collection, Southern Folklife Collection, The Wilson Library, University of North Carolina at Chapel Hill
 
 Life magazine archived photo of Hamblen at November 1949 Billy Graham Crusade in Los Angeles
 Snopes.com article clarifying urban legend about Hamblen's conversion.
 Prohibitionist Party history, mentioning Hamblen's candidacy

1908 births
1989 deaths
20th-century American politicians
20th-century American singers
20th-century evangelicals
American country singer-songwriters
American evangelicals
American temperance activists
Burials at Forest Lawn Memorial Park (Hollywood Hills)
California Democrats
California Prohibitionists
Candidates in the 1952 United States presidential election
Deaths from brain cancer in the United States
Deaths from cancer in California
Decca Records artists
Four Star Records artists
Neurological disease deaths in California
People from Marion County, Texas
Prohibition Party (United States) presidential nominees
RCA Victor artists
Singer-songwriters from Texas
Southern gospel performers